Joseph Clyde Schwantner (born March 22, 1943, Chicago, Illinois) is a Pulitzer Prize-winning American composer, educator and a member of the American Academy of Arts and Letters since 2002. He was awarded the 1970 Charles Ives Prize.

Schwantner is prolific, with many works to his credit. His style is coloristic and eclectic, drawing on such diverse elements as French impressionism, African drumming, and minimalism. His orchestral work Aftertones of Infinity received the 1979 Pulitzer Prize for Music.

Biographical information

Schwantner began his musical study at an early age in classical guitar; this study also incorporated the genres of jazz and folk. He also played the tuba in his high school orchestra. His first compositional aspirations were noticed by his guitar teacher who consistently experienced Schwantner elaborating on pieces he would be studying. From this, Schwantner's teacher suggested he collect these ideas and create his own musical composition. One of his earliest compositions was in the jazz idiom. The piece Offbeats won the National Band Camp Award in 1959. 

Remaining in Chicago, he continued his musical study in composition to the city's American Conservatory, where he graduated with a bachelor's degree in 1964. Here, Schwantner studied with Bernard Dieter. He was exposed to and closely explored the music of Debussy, Bartók, and Messiaen. His graduate study also occurred in Chicago, obtaining master of music and doctorate of music degrees in composition from Northwestern University in 1966 and 1968 respectively. At Northwestern, he was guided under the tutelage of Alan Stout and Anthony Donato. Building on his experiences at the American Conservatory, Schwantner was engaged by the music of Berio and Rochberg. 

These influences, along with those from his undergraduate study, will prove to be distinct and effective influences on his compositional output. As a student of composition, Schwantner continued to aspire with three works being recognized with BMI Student Composer Awards.

After completing his education, Schwantner obtained an assistant professor position at Pacific Lutheran University in 1968. He moved to a similar position at Ball State in 1969 and continued to the Eastman School of Music as a faculty member in 1970. Briefly leaving college academia, Schwantner was composer in residence with the St. Louis Symphony from 1982 to 1984. In 1985, Schwantner's life and music were the subject of a documentary in WGBH Boston's Soundings series. The documentary focused mainly on the composition of his piece New Morning for the World, for narrator and orchestra.

His faculty work continued at the Juilliard School in 1986, and he has currently maintained a position at Yale since 1999. Schwantner retired from his position at Eastman in 1999. His most notable commissions include the song cycle Magabunda for orchestra in 1983, A Sudden Rainbow in 1986, the guitar concerto From Afar... in 1987, and a piano concerto in 1988.

Compositional style

One of Schwantner's early works, Diaphonia intervallum (1967) distinctly foreshadowed the important style traits that would later exist in his music. Beyond its serial structure such elements as individualized style, pedal points, timbre experimentation, instrumental groupings, and the use of extreme ranges were apparent even at this formative stage of Schwantner's career. Upon his appointment to the faculty of the Eastman School of Music, Schwantner's work Consortium I was premiered in 1970. This piece clearly illustrates his personal use of serialism, including many twelve-tone rows hidden among the texture and using a specific intervallic structure to provide cohesion. Consortium II also continued this emphasis on his personal application of serialism. 

From these works, Schwantner turned from this focus on serialism to delve into the effects of tone color in his compositions. This is clearly noticed in his extended use of percussion instruments. Examples of his use of timbre as an important compositional element are found in In aeternum (1973) and Elixir (1976). This can be seen in his larger works for band as well. In ...and the mountains rising nowhere (1977) the six percussionists play a total of 46 instruments in an effort to give the percussion section a more prominent role than what was typical for band works during the 1970s. 

From this stage he began to also concentrate on obtaining clearer tonal centers in works such as Music of Amber (1981) and New Morning for the World: 'Daybreak of Freedom''' (1982). Even as he embraces tonal centers, Schwantner resists the very conventional employment of the dominant-tonic relationships and the Western music expansion of that concept. Rather, Schwantner's tonal centers are created by pitch emphasis, perhaps like the American composer Aaron Copland in a piece like El Salón México. His serialism roots even purvey his tonal structures; clearly defined major and minor scales are scarce in Schwantner's music. Instead, he uses pitch sets to establish organization. Schwantner's later works have integrated minimalist elements. This can be seen in his monumental percussion concerto. However, a very present focus on timbre and tone remain quite evident. His scores are published by the Schott Helicon Music Corporation.

Awards
The Charles Ives Scholarship from the American Academy of Arts and Letters (1970)
Four National Endowment for the Arts Grants (1974–1979)
Kennedy Center Friedheim Competition First Prize (1981)
Pulitzer Prize in Music (1979)
Grammy Nomination for "Best New Classical Composition" (1985)
Grammy Nomination for "Best Classical Composition" (1987)
Honorary Doctor of Fine Arts from the University of Connecticut (2019)

Works

OrchestraA Play of Shadows for Flute and Chamber OrchestraA Sudden RainbowAftertones of Infinity (1978)Angelfire (2002), Fantasy for Amplified Violin and Orchestra, written for the violinist Anne Akiko MeyersBeyond Autumn, Poem for Horn and Orchestra
Concerto for Percussion and Orchestra (1994)
Concerto for Piano and Orchestra (1988)Distant Runes and Incantations for Piano solo (amplified) and OrchestraDreamcaller, three Songs for Soprano, Violin solo, and OrchestraEvening Land SymphonyFreeflight, Fanfares & FantasyFrom Afar..., Fantasy for Guitar and OrchestraMagabunda (Witchnomad), "four Poems of Agueda Pizarro" for Soprano and OrchestraModus CaelestisMorning's Embrace (2006)New Morning for the World "Daybreak of Freedom" for Narrator and Orchestra (1982)September Canticle Fantasy (In Memoriam)Toward LightChasing Light (2008)

Wind ensemble...and the mountains rising nowhere (1977)From a Dark Millennium (1980)In evening's stillness... (1996)Recoil (2004)
 Percussion Concerto (transcribed by Andrew Boysen) (1997)Beyond Autumn (transcribed by Timothy Miles) (2006)
 New Morning for the World "Daybreak of Freedom" (transcribed by Nikk Pilato) (2007)
 Luminosity: Concerto for Wind Orchestra (2015)The Awakening Hour (2017)

Chamber ensembleBlack Anemones, for soprano and pianoCanticle of the Evening Bells, for solo flute, oboe/English horn, clarinet, bassoon, trumpet, horn, trombone, piano, percussion, and stringsChronicon, for bassoon and pianoConsortium I, for flute, clarinet, violin, viola, celloConsortium II, for flute, clarinet, violin, cello, piano, and percussionDistant Runes and Incantations, for flute, clarinet, 2 violins, viola, cello, piano, and percussionElixir, for flute, clarinet, violin, viola, cello, and pianoDiaphonia Intervallum, for alto saxophone, flute, clarinet, 2 violins, viola, 2 celli, string bass, and pianoIn Aeternum (Consortium IV), for cello/bowed crotales, alto flute (flute, piano watergong, 2 crystal glasses), bass clarinet (clarinet, watergong, 2 crystal glasses), viola (violin, crotales), and percussionMusic of Amber, for flute, clarinet/bass clarinet, violin, cello, piano and percussionRhiannon's Blackbirds, for flute/piccolo, clarinet/bass clarinet, violin/viola, cello, piano, and percussionSoaring, for flute and pianoSparrows, for flute/piccolo, clarinet, violin, viola, cello, piano, soprano, and percussion

 Solo 

 Velocities (Moto Perpetuo) for solo marimba (1990)

Representative performances

University of Michigan Band, 8 March 2012
Michael Haithcock, conductor
Jonathan Ovalle, percussion

The President's Own United States Marine Band: The Bicentennial Collection

The Lamont Wind Ensemble
Dr. Joseph Martin, conductor
Mayor Michael B. Hancock, guest narrator

Florida State University Wind Orchestra
Dr. Nikk Pilato, conductor
Dr. David Eccles, narrator

From A Dark Millennium
North Texas Wind Symphony
Eugene Migliaro Corporon, conductor

Selected discographyThe Music of Joseph Schwantner (1997)
Velocities
Concerto for Percussion and Wind Orchestra
New Morning for the World
The National Symphony Orchestra, Evelyn Glennie, percussion and solo marimba, Leonard Slatkin, conductor
BMG Classics/RCA Red Seal CD 09026-68692-2From Afar..."A Fantasy for Guitar" and "American Landscapes" (1987)
Saint Paul Chamber Orchestra, Sharon Isbin, guita, Hugh Wolff, conductor
Virgin Classics CDC 7243-5-55083-2-4New Morning for the World for narrator and orchestra
The Eastman Philharmonia Orchestra, Willie Stargell, narrator, David Effron, music director
Mercury 2890411 031-1New Morning for the World "Daybreak of Freedom" (1982)
Oregon Symphony, Raymond Bazemore, narrator, James DePreist, conductor
Koch International Classics CD 3-7293-2H1From a Dark Millennium "Dream Catchers" (1981)
North Texas Wind Symphony, Eugene Corporon, conductor
Klavier Records KCD 11089In Evening's Stillness..."Wind Dances" (1996)
North Texas Wind Symphony, Eugene Corporon, conductor
Klavier Records KCD 11084...and the mountains rising nowhere (1977)
The Eastman Wind Ensemble
Donald Hunsberger, music director
Sony Records SK 47198From a Dark Millennium (1981)
Ithaca College Wind Ensemble, Rodney Winther, conductor
Ithaca College School of Music
Mark Records, Inc MCBS 35891

Notable students

See also
 Joseph Schwantner: New Morning for the World; Nicolas Flagello: The Passion of Martin Luther KingReferences

Further reading
Folio, Cynthia. (1985). "An Analysis and Comparison of Four Compositions by Joseph Schwantner: And the Mountains Rising Nowhere; Wild Angels of the Open Hills; Aftertones of Infinity; and Sparrows." Doctoral dissertation, University of Rochester.
Folio, Cynthia. (1985). "The Synthesis of Traditional and Contemporary Elements in Joseph Schwantner's Sparrows." Perspectives of New Music, vol. 24/1: 184–196.
Renshaw, Jeffrey. (1991). "Schwantner on Composition." The Instrumentalist'', 45(6)

External links

Schwantner page at The Wind Repertory Project
Interview with Joseph Schwantner, March 13, 2002

20th-century classical composers
21st-century classical composers
American male classical composers
American classical composers
Pulitzer Prize for Music winners
1943 births
Living people
American people of German descent
Members of the American Academy of Arts and Letters
American Conservatory of Music alumni
21st-century American composers
20th-century American composers
20th-century American male musicians
21st-century American male musicians
Eastman School of Music faculty